Paragus angustistylus, the thin-spined grass skimmer, is a rare species of syrphid fly observed in the Great Lakes Region.. Hoverflies can remain nearly motionless in flight. The  adults are also  known as flower flies for they are commonly found on flowers, from which they get both energy-giving nectar and protein-rich pollen.

References

Diptera of North America
Hoverflies of North America
Syrphinae
Insects described in 1986